Manuel Nicolás Carizza (born 23 August 1984 in Rosario) is an Argentine rugby union footballer who usually plays as a lock. He currently plays for French Top 14 side . He started his career with Argentine club Jockey Club de Rosario until he joined French side  in 2005. He spent seven years at Biarritz before joining  for the 2012–13 season.

He made his international debut for Argentina in December 2004 in a match against South Africa, which the Springboks won by 39 points to 7. He next played for the Pumas in April 2005, where he was called up to the starting line-up against Japan. He then played in the November Tests against the Springboks, Scotland and Italy.

He was capped in June 2006 in one of the Tests against Wales during the hosting of a two match series, which Argentina eventually won. He was capped against Chile and Uruguay in July, in the starting line-up for both games.

Honours
 Racing 92
Top 14: 2015–16

References

External links
 Manuel Carizza on ercrugby.com
 Manuel Carizza on lequipe.fr

1984 births
Sportspeople from Rosario, Santa Fe
Argentine rugby union players
Living people
Rugby union locks
Biarritz Olympique players
Racing 92 players
Stormers players
Argentina international rugby union players
Expatriate rugby union players in South Africa
Expatriate rugby union players in France
Argentine expatriate sportspeople in France
Argentine expatriate rugby union players